St Agnes is an electoral division of Cornwall in the United Kingdom and returns one member to sit on Cornwall Council. The current Councillor is Pete Mitchell, a Liberal Democrat.

Councillors

2013-2021

2021-present

Extent

2009-2021
Under its former boundaries, St Agnes represented the villages of St Agnes, Mithian and Trevellas, and the hamlets of Goonvrea and Goonbell. The village of Blackwater was also mostly covered, with the rest being covered by the Chacewater, Kenwyn and Baldhu division. The division was affected by boundary changes in 2013. From 2009 to 2013, it covered 2335 hectares; from 2013 to 2021, it covered 2,331 hectares.

2021-present
With its current boundaries, the division represents the villages of St Agnes, Porthtowan and Mount Hawke, and the hamlets of Goonvrea, Goonbell, Banns and Menagissey. Most of the small village of Mawla is also covered; part of it is covered by the Redruth North division.

Election results

2021 election

2017 election

2013 election

2009 election

References

Electoral divisions of Cornwall Council